Lysiphlebus is a genus of wasps belonging to the family Braconidae.

The genus has almost cosmopolitan distribution.

Species:

Lysiphlebus alpinus 
Lysiphlebus balcanicus 
Lysiphlebus confusus

References

Braconidae
Hymenoptera genera